Tendon rupture is a condition in which a tendon separates in whole or in part from tissue to which it is attached, or is itself torn or otherwise divided in whole or in part.

Examples include:
 Achilles tendon rupture
 Biceps tendon rupture
 Anterior cruciate ligament injury
 Biceps femoris tendon rupture and Quadriceps tendon rupture
 Cruciate ligament#Rupture
 Patellar tendon rupture

References

Injuries